The 2022–23 season is Sunderland's 144th season in the existence and the club's first season back in the Championship since the 2017–18 season following their promotion via the play-offs last season. In addition to the league, they will also compete in the 2022–23 FA Cup and the 2022–23 EFL Cup.

First team squad

Transfers

In

Out

Loans in

Loans out

Pre-season and friendlies
Sunderland announced their would travel to Portugal for a training camp which would include two pre-season friendlies. On 8 June, the club announced seven pre-season friendlies. A further addition to the Portugal tour schedule was confirmed, against Roma.

Competitions

Overall record

Championship

League table

Results summary

Results by round

Matches

On 23 June, the league fixtures were announced.

FA Cup

The Black Cats were drawn away to Shrewsbury Town in the third round and to Fulham in the fourth round.

EFL Cup

Sunderland were drawn away to Sheffield Wednesday in the first round.

Player statistics

Appearance summary

|-
! colspan="18" style="background:#dcdcdc; text-align:center"| Goalkeepers

|-
! colspan="18" style="background:#dcdcdc; text-align:center"| Defenders

|-
! colspan="18" style="background:#dcdcdc; text-align:center"| Midfielders

|-
! colspan="18" style="background:#dcdcdc; text-align:center"| Forwards

|}

Goals record

Penalties record

Excludes penalties taken during Penalty shoot-outs.

Assists record

Disciplinary record

References

Sunderland
Sunderland A.F.C. seasons
English football clubs 2022–23 season